Francis Xavier McInerney (28 March 189924 June 1956) was a United States Navy vice admiral, Navy Cross recipient, Silver Star recipient and namesake of .

Biography
Francis X. McInerney was born on 28 March 1899 in Cheyenne, Wyoming. He was commissioned from the United States Naval Academy in June 1921.

In 1935, he received the degree of Bachelor of Laws from George Washington University Law School. Subsequent tours included , and instructor at the Post-Graduate School, Annapolis, Maryland.

World War II
Later he was assigned to the ANZAC Squadron in the South Pacific and, as senior officer in destroyers, participated in the early strikes in the Solomons and the Battle of the Coral Sea.

In March 1943, he assumed command of Destroyer Squadron 21. He led his ships in the Solomons in the Battle of Kula Gulf and Battle of Kolombangara in July 1943. He was awarded the Bronze Star with Combat "V," the Navy Cross, Presidential Unit Citation, the Silver Star, and the Legion of Merit with Combat "V".

In August 1943, VADM McInerney was assigned as Senior Representative of Commander Destroyers in the South Pacific, and in March 1944, was named chief of staff for Commander Operational Training Command, Pacific Fleet. He assumed command of the battleship  in June 1945. In October 1946, VADM McInerney reported as commanding officer of the Naval Receiving Station, Treasure Island, California. He assumed command of Cruiser Division Three in March 1949. In January 1950, he became Commander Amphibious Training Command, Pacific Fleet. Subsequently, he commanded Amphibious Group Three, Pacific Fleet, and Service Squadron Three.

Post World War II
VADM McInerney's operations in the Korean War as Commander Joint Amphibious Task Forces Seven, Seventy-Six and Ninety-Two earned him the National Defense Service Medal, Korean Service Medal, and the United Nations Service Medal.

In May 1953, he became senior member, Board of Naval Inspection and Survey, West Coast Section. In October 1954, he was assigned as president of the Permanent General Court Martial, Eleventh Naval District. He retired 30 June 1955.

VADM Francis X. McInerney died on 24 June 1956 in San Diego, California. He was buried at Fort Rosecrans National Cemetery, San Diego, California.

See also
, US Navy frigate named for Francis X. McInerney

References

External links
http://valor.militarytimes.com/recipient.php?recipientid=21667
https://web.archive.org/web/20070705102837/http://www.mcinerney.navy.mil/Heritage.html
https://www.findagrave.com/memorial/3417690

1899 births
1956 deaths
George Washington University Law School alumni
United States Naval Academy alumni
United States Navy admirals
United States Navy World War II admirals

Recipients of the Legion of Merit
Recipients of the Navy Cross (United States)
Recipients of the Silver Star
Burials at Fort Rosecrans National Cemetery